Damayanti is a character in a love story found in the Vana Parva book of the Mahabharata. She is the daughter of Bhima (not the Pandava) and a princess of the Vidarbha Kingdom, who marries King Nala of the Nishadha kingdom. The character is also found in other Hindu texts by many authors in numerous Indian languages. She, along with Nala, are the central characters in the 12th century text Nishadha Charita, one of the five mahakavyas (great epic poems) in the canon of Sanskrit literature, written by Sriharsha.

Legend

Marriage 
Damayanti is described to be a beautiful princess of the Vidarbha Kingdom. Having heard the praises of Nala, the king of the Nishadas, in her presence, she grew attracted to him, even though she had never met him. Nala also developed feelings for Damayanti in the same fashion. Once, Nala observed a few swans with golden wings in a grove, and caught one of them. The swan promised to speak highly of him in Damayanti's presence in return for its life. The swan flew to the princess and exalted Nala, persuading her to become the king's wife. Following this incident, Damayanti grew infatuated with Nala. Her friends, who observed her lovesick state, informed her father, King Bhima, that she was ill. The king arranged a svayamvara (self-choice) ceremony for his daughter's wedding. Meanwhile, Narada visited Indra, informing him of the journey of mortal kings and princes to Vidarbha, all of whom sought Damayanti's hand. A number of deities appeared at Indra's court, hearing Narada's description of the princess. They also conveyed their desire to marry Damayanti. Catching sight of Nala, who was also travelling to Damayanti's svayamvara, they tasked him to be their messenger to Damayanti, to ask her to marry one of them. Despite his objections, Nala promptly found Damayanti amid her friends, introduced himself, and conveyed the deities' message. Damayanti informed Nala that she wished to marry him and him alone, and told him that she would choose him during the svayamvara to dissuade his reluctance. Nala informed the deities of their conversation. During the ceremony, Damayanti observed five men who looked exactly like Nala. After some reflection, she proclaimed her decision to marry the king of the nishadas, and urged the deities to reveal their true forms to her. Moved by Damayanti's love, they acquiesced, allowing her to marry Nala, to the joy of all the deities. She enjoyed marital bliss with her husband in forests and groves.

Game of dice 
Kali, incensed that Damayanti had chosen a mortal over any of the deities for her husband, plotted his revenge. He recruited his ally, Dvapara, to help him by manipulating the motions of a dice. Kali then possessed Nala, and offered the kingdom of the nishadas to Pushkara, Nala's younger brother, helping him defeat Nala in a game of dice that lasted over a period of several months. Damayanti lamented about her husband's gambling and rejection of his duties, but Nala remained under Kali's influence. Learning that her husband was almost bereft of his possessions and the trickery behind the motions of the dice, she urged Nala's faithful charioteer to take her twins to her family in Kundina, the capital of Vidarbha. When Nala had gambled away all of his riches and lands, Pushkara suggested that he stake Damayanti, causing the couple to storm away from the kingdom to the forest, donning a single garment each.

Abandonment 
Even as they suffered through fatigue and hunger, Damayanti refused to leave her husband's side, and suggested that they go to her father's kingdom. Nala refused to do so under their present circumstances. The couple finally came across a public dwelling house, where Nala, still under the influence of Kali, abandoned his sleeping wife, reasoning that she would be happier without him. When Damayanti stirred, she bewailed his actions, calling him cruel, and also wondering how he would survive without her. She wished ill on the being who had caused her husband's plight. She was attacked by a giant snake, and was saved by a hunter. When the hunter attempted to rape her, she cursed him to die, which was fulfilled. She came across a hermitage, where she was welcomed by the ascetics and to whom she narrated her tale. The ascetics assured her she would soon find her husband again, restored to fortune. 

Damayanti came across a caravan, joining the traders onboard on their journey to Chedi. A herd of elephants trampled the sleeping traders while they slept. Bemoaning her fate, she joined a group of Brahmanas and reached the capital of Chedi. She attracted the attention of the king's mother, who enquired regarding her identity. Damayanti identified herself as a maidservant of noble birth, and explained her plight to her. The queen invited her to stay with her. Damayanti agreed, on the condition that she is respected and was allowed to do as she wished.

Meanwhile, Nala came across a great forest fire, and a snake named Karkotaka beseeching him to save it from danger. After being rescued, Karkotaka requested him to count his steps while he proceeded, and bit the king upon his tenth step. The king's body became deformed. The snake explained to Nala that he would experience no pain due to the bite, which would cause distress to the being who had possessed him. Karkotaka instructed the king to go to King Rituparna of Ayodhya, who would become his friend and allow him to gain mastery over the dice, following which he would be reunited with Damayanti. He also offered Nala some garments, stating that he would regain his original form upon wearing them.

Reunion 
A Brahmana dispatched by Bhima named Sudeva located Damayanti, following which Damayanti returned to Vidarbha, where she was reunited with her family. She sent Brahmanas as messengers across a number of countries, repeating a certain monologue. A Brahmana sent to Ayodhya informed Damayanti that the charioteer of the king, named Bahuka, had responded to the monologue with one of his own, repeating which she suspected that Bahuka was Nala. Damayanti asked Sudeva to travel to Ayodhya and invite Rituparna for her second svayamvara, in which she would choose her new husband the following sunrise. Hiding his anguish, Nala offered to drive the king, assuring him that he could charioteer the distance from Ayodhya to Videha in a single day. During the journey, Rituparna imparted him his knowledge of the dice, in exchange for Nala's knowledge of charioteering. Upon his acquisition of knowledge, Kali emerged from Nala's body, freeing him of his influence, but retaining his deformed body. After reaching Vidarbha, Damayanti had Bahuka questioned and examined, and was all but certain that he was her husband. When his children were brought before him, he wept. Damayanti appeared before him, assuring Nala of her fidelity to him; Vayu, the wind-god, testified to this upon her request, revealing that the second svayamvara had been a scheme, held with the knowledge that only Nala could cover a distance of a hundred yojanas in a single day. Reuniting, Damayanti and Nala settled their differences and reconciled. Donning the garments Karkotaka had given him, the king regained his true form. Nala returned to his kingdom and challenged Pushkara for a game of dice, staking their lives, riches, and the entire kingdom. Victorious, Nala granted Pushkara his life, regaining all that he had lost. Damayanti and her children returned to Nala, and spent the rest of their lives in happiness and fame.

Translations
Norman Mosley Penzer translated the tale of Nala and Damayanti in 1926 into English.

See also
The Story of Nal and Damayanti in Bhakti and Sufism Accounts
Damajanti, a 1903 cantata by Max Bruch based on the poem Nala and Damajanti by Friedrich Rückert, with excerpts from a poem by Heinrich Bulthaupt.
Odysseus and Penelope

References

Further reading

External links

 The Naishadha-Charita (story of Nala and Damayanti) English translation by K. K. Handiqui  [proofread] (includes glossary)
Story of Nala and Damayanti English Translation 
Story of Nala and Damayanti from Mahabharata

Characters in Hindu mythology
Characters in the Mahabharata